is a retired Japanese Grand Prix motorcycle road racer and Superbike rider. He is not related to the former Formula One racer Shinji Nakano.

Career

Early career
Nakano was All-Japan 250cc champion in 1998, the highlight of a long career in both 125cc and 250cc Japanese national championships. Nakano moved to international competition full-time in 1999, adjusting to 250cc Grand Prix racing quickly, finishing fourth overall with five podium finishes. In 2000 Nakano and teammate Olivier Jacque battled with Daijiro Kato for the title, which ultimately went to Jacque. Nakano set the fastest 250cc lap at Motegi in 2000, a record that stood until 2008 – the longest standing lap record in the series.

250cc & 500cc/MotoGP World Championship

For 2001 the Tech 3 team moved up to the 500cc World Championship, which would eventually become MotoGP in 2002. Despite having semi-works machinery, Nakano only managed to finish fifth in the championship. Nakano started 2002 on a 500cc two-stroke machine, but the team was able to provide the newer 990cc four-stroke by the end of the season. 2003 was less successful prompting a move to Kawasaki for 2004.

Kawasaki suffered a disastrous debut year with Garry McCoy and Andrew Pitt, before the team improved with Nakano on board. The team's first podium came at the 2004 Japanese Grand Prix and two seasons of consistent results earned him a pair of 10th place championship finishes. In 2006 Nakano was able to produce strong qualifying runs but less competitive races, a trait of the Bridgestone tyres. Two jump-start penalties did not help Nakano's results. At the 2006 Australian Grand Prix, Nakano started on the front row and lead the early laps, before switching to wet tyres too late and not being competitive on them.

For 2007 Nakano joined Konica Minolta Honda. Results were thin in 2007, with only a handful of top 10 qualifying and race results. Rumors began that Nakano might make the move to the highly competitive World Superbike Championship for the 2008 season. However, Nakano ultimately joined Fausto Gresini's MotoGP team, replacing Toni Elías. Bringing experience with Bridgestone tyres and Honda bikes, he had a solid if unspectacular season, scoring more points in the first half of 2008 than in the whole of 2007. At Brno, Nakano was given the factory spring-valve Honda RC212V, beginning a string of greatly improved results. Nakano left the Gresini team at the end of the 2008 season, following the team's decision to sign Alice Ducati rider Toni Elías for 2009.

Superbike World Championship
In 2009, Nakano was signed by Aprilia along with Max Biaggi for their return to the World Superbike Championship after a three-year absence. He finished the season in 14th place. On October 28, 2009, Nakano announced that he would be retiring from professional motorcycle racing. The decision followed a season in which he had struggled with injury problems, including a broken collarbone and a neck injury that kept him out of the final three rounds of the season.

Career statistics

Grand Prix motorcycle racing

Races by year
(key) (Races in bold indicate pole position) (Races in italics indicate fastest lap)

References

External links

  

1977 births
Sportspeople from Tokyo
Sportspeople from Chiba Prefecture
Japanese motorcycle racers
Kawasaki Motors Racing MotoGP riders
500cc World Championship riders
250cc World Championship riders
Superbike World Championship riders
Living people
Tech3 MotoGP riders
Gresini Racing MotoGP riders
MotoGP World Championship riders